"Rumour Has It" is a song by the American singer Donna Summer, released in 1978. It was a moderate hit, peaking at #53 in the US and #19 in the UK, and #20 in the Netherlands.

The song was originally featured on Summer's Once Upon a Time album, a concept album that tells the "fairytale" story of a girl's adventures as she goes from rags to riches. This song is found towards the end of the album, when the main character hears that someone is "looking for a girl like me" and hopes that the man in question is someone she has liked for some time. One of the verses in the original version was edited out for the 7" format. It is one of the earliest examples of disco, funk, rock, and electronica in pop culture. This was the second big hit in the UK from her Once Upon A Time album, which is most notable for its electronic suite on side 2, that influenced punk rock artists in the development of the 1980s new wave movement.

Record World said that the song is "in [Summers'] signature style."

Chart positions

References

Donna Summer songs
1978 singles
Songs written by Pete Bellotte
Songs written by Giorgio Moroder
Songs written by Donna Summer
Casablanca Records singles
Song recordings produced by Giorgio Moroder
Song recordings produced by Pete Bellotte
1978 songs

es:Rumour Has It (canción de Adele)